Richard Donald Mrozik (born January 2, 1975) is an American former professional ice hockey player who played two games in the National Hockey League for the Calgary Flames in 2002–03.   Mrozik was drafted by the Dallas Stars in the 6th round, 136th overall, in the 1993 NHL Entry Draft.  He retired following the 2004–05 season after spending eight years in the minor leagues.

Mrozik spent four years at the University of Minnesota Duluth, where he was named a Second Team All-Star by the Western Collegiate Hockey Association in his senior year of 1996–97.

Career statistics

Awards and honors

External links

1975 births
Calgary Flames players
Dallas Stars draft picks
Edmonton Road Runners players
Living people
Minnesota Duluth Bulldogs men's ice hockey players
Pee Dee Pride players
Ice hockey people from Duluth, Minnesota
Portland Pirates players
Rochester Americans players
Saint John Flames players
Syracuse Crunch players
Worcester IceCats players
American men's ice hockey centers